Sobha is a 1958 Indian Telugu-language drama film directed by Kamalakara Kameswara Rao. It stars N. T. Rama Rao and Anjali Devi.  The film was produced by Ponnaluri Brothers under the Sri Lakshmi Prasanna Pictures banner. Music was composed by A. M. Rajah in his debut. Sobha was a remake of the Hindi film Dulari (1949). The film was recorded as a Hit at the box office.

Plot
Seetamma (Hemalatha) a widow, has a daughter Sobha. On the occasion of Sobha's fifth birthday, Sitamma's brother Sankaram (Relangi) gifts her a locket with the picture of Sobha and her parents in it and promised that he will marry Sobha to his son Raja.

At midnight there is a theft in Seetamma's house by a tribal gang led by Sardar (Dr. Sivaramakrishnayya). Noticing Sobha wearing so much jewelry, they kidnap her. Sardar asks his sister Nagamma (Venkumamba) to rear the baby along with her daughter Kasturi. Sobha grows as Rani (Anjali Devi). Tribal youth Lala (Mukkamala) loves Rani but Kasturi (Rajasulochana) loves Lala. 

Once Rani and Kasturi dance in a village. Raja (N. T. Rama Rao) sees Rani and starts loving her. Raja, with the help of his friend Sambhu (Ramana Reddy), finds out the place where Rani lives and gives her a ring. Lala feels that Rani is in love with someone and cautions Nagamma. When Raja and Rani meet in the garden, Lala beats Raja. Sambhu takes the injured Raja to his house when he tells his father Sankaram regarding his love affair, which he does not accept. Sankaram is annoyed; Raja's behavior sends him out of the house.

Raja goes to Rani's place and with the help of Nagamma, they both escape from there. Lala chases them. Raja and Rani reach Seetamma's house and she welcomes them wholeheartedly. Meanwhile, Lala Kidnaps Rani. Raja runs after them, Sankaram also takes the police and goes behind them. Police surround the tribal hamlet and start firing, in which Sardar dies and asks Nagamma to hand over Rani to their parents. Lala forces Rani to come with him, but Kasturi obstructs his way, receives a knife injury, and dies. Raja reaches there and in the combat, Lala dies.

Raja takes Rani to his house, but Sankaram does not agree to their marriage. At the same time, Sambhu brings Nagamma, who reveals that Rani is none other than Sobha and shows the locket. Finally, the movie ends with the marriage of Raja and Sobha.

Cast
N. T. Rama Rao as Raja
Anjali Devi as Sobha / Rani 
Relangi as Sankaram
Ramana Reddy as Sambhu
Mukkamala as Lala
Dr. Sivaramakrishnayya as Sardar
Rajasulochana as Kasthuri
Hemalatha as Seetamma
Venkumamba as Nagamma
Vijayalakshmi as Raja's mother

Soundtrack

Music was composed by A. M. Rajah. Lyrics were written by P. Vasanth Kumar Reddy. Music released by Audio Company.

Box office
Sobha fared reasonably well at the box office and celebrated a 100-day run at Vijayawada.

References

External links
 
 Watch Sobha (1958) full movie at Youtube.

1958 films
Indian black-and-white films
Films directed by Kamalakara Kameswara Rao
Indian drama films
Telugu remakes of Hindi films
1958 drama films